The South London line is a railway line in inner south London, England. The initial passenger service on the route was established by the London, Brighton & South Coast Railway on 1 May 1867 when the central London terminal stations of Victoria and London Bridge were connecting to the inner south London suburbs of Clapham, Brixton, Camberwell and Peckham. Most of the line was built on a high level viaduct above other transport infrastructure. The line is in Travelcard Zone 2.

History 
The London, Chatham and Dover Railway (LCDR) was authorised to build the former route of the line by the South London Railway Act 1862. Designed and engineered under Frederick Banister, it re-used the Wandsworth Road to Brixton section built as part of the LCDR main line. The line was quadrupled and extended to London Bridge. The northern pair of tracks (becoming the Chatham Lines), without stations, was used by the LCDR to Kent; the southern (becoming the Atlantic lines) were used by the London, Brighton and South Coast Railway (LBSCR) into east Surrey parts of which became Greater London. Several stations were shared by the two companies.

LBSCR passenger service began 13 August 1866 between Loughborough Park and London Bridge. It was extended to Victoria on 1 May 1867.

The LBSCR scheme, authorised in 1903, pioneered main-line rail electrification in the UK, and the first electric train ran on 1 December 1909. For the following three years, steam trains alternated with electrics, the latter operating every 15 minutes from 7.30am to midnight. Passenger numbers had fallen on introducing electric tramways in South London by 1.25 million in six months. In the first year of the rival line's electric operation passengers increased from 4 million to 7.5 million. The electrification used the overhead system at 6700 V AC, supplied by a power station at Deptford. After creation of the Big Four railway companies, the Southern Railway installed standard third-rail 660 V DC supply on 17 June 1928.
Pre-extension route
The Southern service between London Victoria and London Bridge was axed in favour of joining to Clapham Junction and the London Overground's East London line leading to a reduction to peak-hour and Saturday services, adopting the west end of the old route (between London Victoria and Peckham Rye).

East London line extension into South London line

In 2012 a  diversion was made to the eastern end to join to the East London line, a former London Underground line which was reconverted to main line operation as part of Phase 2 of its extension project reinstating an alignment between Rotherhithe and Peckham that had been disused since 1911, via Old Kent Road station. Completion was scheduled for May 2012 in time for the London 2012 Summer Olympic and Paralympic Games, which was not achieved as the line opened on 9 December 2012.

Services

Passenger rail services were provided post-privatisation from 1991 until 2012 by Southern, as with continuing services on the eastern section from Peckham Rye to London Bridge. These services were part of the discontinued London Bridge - London Victoria service via Denmark Hill.

Services along part of the line are operated by Southeastern on the Victoria-Dartford line and the Chatham Main Lines, calling only at Denmark Hill and Peckham Rye.

The London Overground also runs on this line as part of the Clapham Junction - Dalston Junction / Highbury & Islington service. Trains also call at Wandsworth Road and Clapham High Street stations.

Southern also operates regular services from London Bridge to Caterham and Beckenham Junction. These services run along a small portion of the line, joining up from the Sutton and Mole Valley Lines at Peckham Rye, until it diverges from the London Overground at Queen's Road (Peckham) as trains continue towards London Bridge.

From January 2015

The Thameslink Programme caused Southeastern to make these timetable modifications:

Off-peak & Saturday
4tph between Clapham Junction and Highbury & Islington (London Overground)
2tph between London Victoria and Dartford via Bexleyheath (Southeastern)
1tph between London Victoria and Dover Priory via Chatham (Stopping at Denmark Hill only - Southeastern)

Evenings:
4tph between Clapham Junction & Highbury Islington (London Overground)
2tph between London Victoria & Dartford (Southeastern)
1tph between London Victoria & Dover Priory via Chatham (Stopping at Denmark Hill Only - Southeastern)

Sundays:
4tph between Clapham Junction & Highbury Islington (London Overground)
2tph between London Victoria & Dartford (Southeastern)
1tph between London Victoria & Dover Priory via Chatham (stop on route: Denmark Hill - Southeastern)

Addition of New Bermondsey station 

The East London line extension plans of 2001 proposed a new station at Surrey Canal Road near the Bermondsey/New Cross border. A campaign group was formed in 2009 by Bermondsey residents to press for funding to be made available.  In September 2010, the £7 million funding was refused by the Department for Transport, which Property developer Renewal in 2012 agreed to fund as part of a development scheme and Lewisham Council accordingly granted planning permission. During a presentation at the site as part of the Open House 2014 weekend, Renewal announced a process of choosing a more recognizable name was underway with TfL.  The decision reached for this part of the former south London dockyards is New Bermondsey. Construction work began in 2016.

Proposed developments

Victoria to Bellingham service

Speed of access of major destinations has changed as a result of the 2012 re-routing. The line since 2012 takes in Canada Water station, closely linked to Canary Wharf; similarly from Clapham Junction the West London line (including Kensington Olympia) is made directly available.

London Victoria and London Bridge since 2012 became indirectly linked — via Clapham Junction or Peckham respectively. A demonstration took place to restore the route during the month when the route changed. A survey by London Travelwatch found that 88% of passengers on the line felt they would be inconvenienced by the changes (although the survey also noted that respondents were generally unaware of the East London line/Overground proposals or of any possible benefits they might bring).

To compensate for the loss of services, it was proposed to introduce a Victoria- service.  This would restore the old route to Peckham Rye and take in part of the Catford Loop Line, to Bellingham in south-east London. The proposal was abandoned due to funding issues.

Pressure groups and local MPs urged the Mayor to reconsider who secured funding in principle from the Secretary of State for Transport for greater line use or branches to be added. TfL compiled a shortlist of proposals to address the upset in commuting times.

Lobbying for additional stations
In 2004, concerns were raised by local politicians and residents that the Brixton area was not being served by the line and campaigners criticised the East London line Extension project for missing opportunities to create interchange stations with Thameslink and the London Underground Victoria line.

Plans were not produced for such stations as the line is on high viaduct, increasing the costs prohibitively. The Mayor of London, Ken Livingstone, expressed doubts that any proposals to construct these stations would pass a cost-benefit analysis and that they would be unlikely to be approved.  Lambeth Council and the East London line Group have expressed support for an interchange station at Brixton and have requested that this proposal be considered for future funding. Suggestions have been made that East Brixton station could be re-opened as an alternative.

See also 
 London Overground
 Sutton and Mole Valley Lines
 Catford Loop Line

Notes and references

Notes

External links 

 South London Press article: 'Boris slammed on South London Line'
 South London Press article: 'Bid to save the South London Line'
 .

Railway lines in London
Transport in the London Borough of Southwark
Transport in the London Borough of Lambeth
London Overground
Standard gauge railways in London